The Crucifixion Standard (Italian - Stendardo della Crocifissione) is a double-sided c.1502-1505 tempera on panel painting by Luca Signorelli, produced late in his career and now on the high altar of Sant'Antonio Abate church in Sansepolcro. The reverse shows Anthony the Great and John the Evangelist with brothers kneeling before them in hierarchical proportion, whilst the front shows the Crucifixion with Anthony, John, Mary Magdalene and the Virgin Mary.

Gallery

References

1505 paintings
Paintings by Luca Signorelli
Paintings in Tuscany
Signorelli
Paintings of the Virgin Mary
Paintings depicting Mary Magdalene
Paintings of Anthony the Great